Wraith: Welcome to Christmasland is a comic book miniseries written by Joe Hill, illustrated by C. P. Wilson III, Jay Fotos and published by IDW Publishing. It is a prequel to Hill's 2013 novel NOS4A2 and is partially derived from material cut from the novel. Hill describes it as a "sleazy '80s horror film I always wanted to do."

Synopsis
The story follows a group of police officers and prisoners who find themselves in Christmasland, where they are terrorized by Charlie Manx and his abominable children.

Story arc

"Welcome to Christmasland"

Reception
Wraith: Welcome to Christmasland was well received by critics scoring an average rating of 8.5 for the entire series based on 41 critic reviews aggregated by Comic Book Roundup.

References

Comic book limited series
Horror comics
IDW Publishing titles
Works by Joe Hill (writer)